Custer Township is a civil township of Mason County in the U.S. state of Michigan. The population was 1,254 at the 2010 census. The village of Custer is located within the township.

Custer Township was named for George Armstrong Custer, a United States Army officer.

Geography

Demographics
As of the census of 2000, there were 1,307 people, 489 households, and 370 families residing in the township. There were 550 housing units at an average density of 15.7 per square mile (6.1/km2). The racial makeup of the township was 95.10% White, 0.31% African American, 1.45% Native American, 0.31% Asian, 1.07% from other races, and 1.76% from two or more races. Hispanic or Latino of any race were 3.14% of the population.

There were 489 households, out of which 33.9% had children under the age of 18 living with them, 64.8% were married couples living together, 8.0% had a female householder with no husband present, and 24.3% were non-families. 20.7% of all households were made up of individuals, and 10.0% had someone living alone who was 65 years of age or older.  The average household size was 2.63 and the average family size was 3.02.

In the township the population was spread out, with 25.7% under the age of 18, 7.3% from 18 to 24, 26.7% from 25 to 44, 26.2% from 45 to 64, and 14.0% who were 65 years of age or older.  The median age was 39 years. For every 100 females, there were 98.3 males.  For every 100 females age 18 and over, there were 95.4 males.

The median income for a household in the township was $36,597, and the median income for a family was $40,625. Males had a median income of $32,143 versus $23,625 for females. The per capita income for the township was $17,407.  About 9.1% of families and 9.8% of the population were below the poverty line, including 12.6% of those under age 18 and 6.4% of those age 65 or over.

References

Townships in Mason County, Michigan
Townships in Michigan